Managed float regime is an international financial environment in which exchange rates fluctuate from day to day, but central banks attempt to influence their countries' exchange rates by buying and selling currencies to maintain a certain range. The peg used is known as a crawling peg.

In an increasingly integrated world economy, the currency rates impact any given country's economy through the trade balance. In this aspect, almost all currencies are managed since central banks or governments intervene to influence the value of their currencies. According to the International Monetary Fund, as of 2014, 82 countries and regions used a managed float, or 43% of all countries, constituting a plurality amongst exchange rate regime types.

List of countries with managed floating currencies

Source IMF as of April 31, 2008

See also
December Mistake
Black Wednesday
Fixed exchange rate
Floating exchange rate or Floating currency

References

International finance
Open economy macroeconomics